Caitlin Moran (born 20 November 1996) is an Australian professional rugby league footballer who currently plays for the Newcastle Knights in the NRL Women's Premiership. She has represented Australia at international level.

Playing career
Moran was a member of the winning Australia women's national rugby league team squad for the 2017 Women's Rugby League World Cup. She went on to play a pivotal role, including kicking a decisive field goal in the final.

In June 2018, Moran, along with Ali Brigginshaw, Brittany Breayley, Heather Ballinger and Teuila Fotu-Moala, were named as the five marquee players for the Brisbane Broncos women's team which commenced playing in the NRL Women's Premiership in September. However, in the previous month, Moran suffered an anterior cruciate ligament injury which ruled her out of the inaugural NRL Women's season. This meant she missed being part of the club's premiership win.

In June 2022, Moran signed with the Newcastle Knights for the 2022 season. In round 3 of the 2022 season, she made her NRLW debut for the Knights against the Parramatta Eels.

On 2 October 2022, Moran played in the Knights' 32-12 NRLW Grand Final win over the Parramatta Eels.

Controversies
In 2022, Moran was suspended for one match and fined by the National Rugby League for derogatory comments she made on Instagram about Queen Elizabeth II on the date of her death.

References

External links
Newcastle Knights profile

1996 births
Living people
Australian female rugby league players
Newcastle Knights (NRLW) players
Rugby league halfbacks
Sportswomen from New South Wales
Australia women's national rugby league team players